Elisabeth "Liesl" Nestler (born 14 November 1951) is an Austrian former competitive figure skater. She represented Austria at the 1968 Winter Olympics, placing 23rd, and at seven ISU Championships, finishing in the top ten four times. Her highest placement was 5th, achieved at the 1969 European Championships in Garmisch-Partenkirchen and 1970 European Championships in Leningrad. Her best world result, 7th, came at the 1969 World Championships in Colorado Springs, Colorado.

Competitive highlights

References 

1951 births
Austrian female single skaters
Figure skaters at the 1968 Winter Olympics
Living people
Olympic figure skaters of Austria
Figure skaters from Vienna